James Andrew Williams (January 4, 1847 – October 23, 1918) was an American manager in Major League Baseball for three seasons. He had a career win–loss record of 110–169 in 282 games managed.

Williams died in Westbury, New York, at the age of 71, and is interred Green Lawn Cemetery in Columbus, Ohio.

References

External links
Baseball Reference – career managerial statistics

1847 births
1918 deaths
St. Louis Cardinals managers
Cleveland Blues (1887–1888) managers
People from Clark County, Ohio
Burials at Green Lawn Cemetery (Columbus, Ohio)